Radiofar (Serbian Cyrillic: Радиофар) is a suburban neighborhood of Belgrade, the capital of Serbia. It is located in the Belgrade's municipality of Surčin.

Radiofar, actually a sub-neighborhood of Surčin,  is a settlement near the Belgrade's Nikola Tesla Airport, 10 km west of downtown Belgrade. It is located in the vicinity the Belgrade-Zagreb highway, close to the airport's control tower. This is how the settlement got its name ('radiofar' = aerodrome beacon).

Settlement began to develop in the late 1980s as the weekend-settlement, but grew with an influx of refugees as the result of the Yugoslav Wars from 1991. Estimated population by 2011 was over 3,000.

References

Suburbs of Belgrade
Populated places in Syrmia
Surčin